The Ukiah Daily Journal is an American daily paid newspaper which serves the city of Ukiah and surrounding Mendocino County, California. Published daily Tuesday through Sunday, its estimated  circulation is 6,795.

It is currently edited by K. C. Meadows.

History 
The Journal traces its history back to the foundation of the weekly Mendocino Democrat in 1868 by Alex Montgomery.  It was later consolidated with the Weekly Dispatch (founded in 1873), under the ownership of Peabody and A.W. Sefton. In 1898, J. B. Sanford purchased the paper, and in 1913 took on partner E. P. Thurston, who managed many of the day-to-day operations. Thurston would edit and publish the paper for 36 years, eventually selling it to Ben Cober.

From 1936 to 1939 it was a daily without Sundays, but reverted to a semi-weekly for financial reasons. This was the Dispatch Democrat owned by Mr. Cober. In 1949, Cober bought the Ukiah Republican Press and created the combined Redwood Journal-Press-Dispatch, issuing the first issue under the Daily Journal name on April 19, 1954. In 1960, the paper merged with the weekly Willits News and Ukiah News in an effort to reduce costs through consolidation. In 1988, after the Anderson Valley Advertiser printed a hoax interview (supposedly with Congressman Douglas Bosco), the Ukiah Daily Journal, which had had the printing contract for that paper, banned the use of its press by the Advertiser.

The out-of-state Donrey Media Group (now Stephens Media) took over in 1984. In 1999,  MediaNews Group (California Newspaper bought the paper as part of a ten newspaper deal with Donrey meant to expand MediaNews's holdings in Los Angeles and Northern California.

Saturday editions ran from 2003, making it a true daily newspaper until 2011. It now runs on a Tuesday-Sunday publication schedule.

Recognition 
In 2017, the Ukiah Daily Journal won 1st place in the Coverage of Local Government category in its division of  California's Better Newspapers Contest.

References

Daily newspapers published in California
Mendocino County, California